Diedra cockerellana, Cockerell's moth, is a species of moth of the family Tortricidae. It is found in North America, where it has been recorded from California, Colorado, Illinois, Indiana, Iowa, New Mexico, Ontario, Utah and Wisconsin.

The moth is about 18–22 mm. The forewings are yellowish-brown, covered by series of connected loops. Two of these have a black margin and white filling. Adults have been recorded on wing from July to October.

References

Moths described in 1907
Archipini